James Holmes may refer to:

Artists 
 Jimmy "Duck" Holmes (born 1947), American blues musician
 James Flournoy Holmes, album cover artist
 James Holmes (actor) (born 1965), British actor
 James Holmes (artist) (1777–1860), English painter
 James Roland Holmes (1939–1999), organist, partner of Ned Rorem
 James S. Holmes (1924–1986), Dutch poet and translator

Criminals 
 James Holmes (mass murderer) (born 1987), convicted of the 2012 Aurora shooting
 James William Holmes (1956–1994), convicted murderer of Don Lehman

Public servants 
 James Holmes (politician) (1831–1910), member of the New Zealand Legislative Council
 James Howard Holmes (born 1943), diplomat
 James Leon Holmes (born 1951), U.S. federal judge
 James M. Holmes (born 1957), United States Air Force general

Sportspeople 
 Ducky Holmes (James William Holmes, 1869–1932), baseball player
 Jim Holmes (baseball) (1882–1960), baseball pitcher
 Jimmy Holmes (footballer, born 1908) (1908–1971), English footballer
 Jimmy Holmes (footballer, born 1953), Irish footballer
 Jim Holmes (footballer) (born 1954), Scottish footballer

Trade unionists 
 James Holmes (trade unionist) (1861–1934), English railway industry trade unionist
 Jimmy Holmes (trade unionist) (1850–1911), English hosiery industry trade unionist

Other 
 James H. Holmes (1826–1900), Baptist minister in Richmond, Virginia

See also 
 Jamie Holmes (disambiguation)